Moosh can refer to 
Muş, a town in Turkey
(موش) Mouse in Persian 
A character in The Legend of Zelda: Oracle of Ages and Seasons
Australian slang for "mouth"